Pankratovo is a rural locality (a village) in Sidorovskoye Rural Settlement, Gryazovetsky District, Vologda Oblast, Russia. The population was 53 as of 2002.

Geography 
Pankratovo is located 51 km southeast of Gryazovets (the district's administrative centre) by road. Sidorovo is the nearest rural locality.

References 

Rural localities in Gryazovetsky District